The following outline is provided as an overview of and topical guide to Palau:

Palau – island country and a United States Associated State located in the western Pacific Ocean. It is geographically part of the larger island group of Micronesia. The country's population of around 21,000 is spread across 250 islands forming the western chain of the Caroline Islands. The most populous island is Koror. The capital Ngerulmud is located in Melekeok State on the nearby island of Babeldaob. The islands share maritime boundaries with Indonesia, the Philippines, and the Federated States of Micronesia.

General reference 

 Pronunciation:
 Common English country name:  Palau
 Official English country name:  The Republic of Palau
 Common endonym(s): Belau
 Official endonym(s):  
 Adjectival(s): Palauan
 Demonym(s):
 Etymology: Name of Palau
 ISO country codes:  PW, PLW, 585
 ISO region codes:  See ISO 3166-2:PW
 Internet country code top-level domain:  .pw

Geography of Palau 

Geography of Palau
 Palau is: an island country
 Location:
 Northern Hemisphere and Eastern Hemisphere
 Pacific Ocean
 North Pacific Ocean
 Oceania
 Micronesia
 Time zone:  UTC+09
 Extreme points of Palau
 High:  Mount Ngerchelchuus on Babeldaob 
 Low:  North Pacific Ocean 0 m
 Land boundaries:  none
 Coastline:  North Pacific Ocean 1,519 km
 Population of Palau: 20,000  - 211th most populous country

 Area of Palau: 459 km2
 Atlas of Palau

Environment of Palau 

Environment of Palau
 Climate of Palau
 Renewable energy in Palau
 Geology of Palau
 Protected areas of Palau
 Biosphere reserves in Palau
 National parks of Palau
 Wildlife of Palau
 Fauna of Palau
 Birds of Palau
 Mammals of Palau

Natural geographic features of Palau 

 Islands of Palau
 Lakes of Palau
 Mountains of Palau
 Volcanoes in Palau
 Rivers of Palau
 Waterfalls of Palau
 World Heritage Sites in Palau: None

Regions of Palau 

Regions of Palau

Ecoregions of Palau 

List of ecoregions in Palau
 Ecoregions in Palau

Administrative divisions of Palau 

Administrative divisions of Palau
 States of Palau
 Municipalities of Palau

States of Palau 

States of Palau

Municipalities of Palau 

Municipalities of Palau
 Capital of Palau: Ngerulmud
 Cities of Palau

Demography of Palau 

Demographics of Palau

Government and politics of Palau 

Politics of Palau
 Form of government:
 Capital of Palau: Ngerulmud
 Elections in Palau
 Political parties in Palau

Branches of the government of Palau 

Government of Palau
Executive Branch, consisting of one Head of Government
Legislative Branch
Upper House:Senate
Lower House:House of Delegates
Judiciary Branch

Executive branch of the government of Palau 
 Head of state: President of Palau

Legislative branch of the government of Palau 

 Parliament of Palau - Olbiil Era Kelulau (bicameral)
 Upper house: Senate of Palau
 Lower house: House of Delegates

Judicial branch of the government of Palau 

Court system of Palau
 Supreme Court of Palau
National Court
Court of Common Pleas
Land Court

Foreign relations of Palau 

Foreign relations of Palau
 Diplomatic missions in Palau
 Diplomatic missions of Palau
 United States-Palau relations

International organization membership 
The Republic of Palau is a member of:

African, Caribbean, and Pacific Group of States (ACP)
Asian Development Bank (ADB)
Food and Agriculture Organization (FAO)
International Atomic Energy Agency (IAEA)
International Bank for Reconstruction and Development (IBRD)
International Civil Aviation Organization (ICAO)
International Development Association (IDA)
International Federation of Red Cross and Red Crescent Societies (IFRCS)
International Finance Corporation (IFC)
International Monetary Fund (IMF)
International Olympic Committee (IOC)

International Red Cross and Red Crescent Movement (ICRM)
Inter-Parliamentary Union (IPU)
Multilateral Investment Guarantee Agency (MIGA)
Organisation for the Prohibition of Chemical Weapons (OPCW)
Pacific Islands Forum (PIF)
Secretariat of the Pacific Community (SPC)
South Pacific Regional Trade and Economic Cooperation Agreement (Sparteca)
United Nations (UN)
United Nations Conference on Trade and Development (UNCTAD)
United Nations Educational, Scientific, and Cultural Organization (UNESCO)
World Health Organization (WHO)

Law and order in Palau 

Law of Palau
 Cannabis in Palau
 Constitution of Palau
 Crime in Palau
 Human rights in Palau
 LGBT rights in Palau
 Freedom of religion in Palau
 Law enforcement in Palau

Military of Palau 

Military of Palau
 Command
 Commander-in-chief:
 Ministry of Defence of Palau
 Forces
 Army of Palau
 Navy of Palau
 Air Force of Palau
 Special forces of Palau
 Military history of Palau
 Military ranks of Palau

Local government in Palau 

Local government in Palau

History of Palau 

History of Palau
Timeline of the history of Palau
Current events of Palau
 Military history of Palau

Culture of Palau 

Culture of Palau
 Architecture of Palau
 Cuisine of Palau
 Festivals in Palau
 Languages of Palau
 Media in Palau
 National symbols of Palau
 Coat of arms of Palau
 Flag of Palau
 National anthem of Palau
 People of Palau
 Public holidays in Palau
 Records of Palau
 Religion in Palau
 Christianity in Palau
 Hinduism in Palau
 Islam in Palau
 Judaism in Palau
 Sikhism in Palau
 World Heritage Sites in Palau: None

Art in Palau 
 Art in Palau
 Cinema of Palau
 Literature of Palau
 Music of Palau
 Television in Palau
 Theatre in Palau

Sports in Palau 

Sports in Palau
 Football in Palau
 Palau at the Olympics

Economy and infrastructure of Palau 

Economy of Palau
 Economic rank, by nominal GDP (2007): 186th (one hundred and eighty sixth)
 Agriculture in Palau
 Banking in Palau
 National Bank of Palau
 Communications in Palau
 Internet in Palau
 Companies of Palau
Currency of Palau: Dollar
ISO 4217: USD
 Energy in Palau
 Energy policy of Palau
 Oil industry in Palau
 Mining in Palau
 Tourism in Palau
 Visa policy of Palau
 Transport in Palau
 Palau Stock Exchange

Education in Palau 

Education in Palau

Infrastructure of Palau
 Health care in Palau
 Transportation in Palau
 Airports in Palau
 Rail transport in Palau
 Roads in Palau
 Water supply and sanitation in Palau

See also 

Palau
Index of Palau-related articles
List of international rankings
List of Palau-related topics
Member state of the United Nations
Outline of Oceania
Palauan language

References

External links 

 Official Site of the Honorary Consulate of the Republic of Palau to the United Kingdom of Great Britain & NI
 Official Site of the Republic of Palau
 Palau National Congress - Olbiil Era Kelulau, Senate
 
 

Palau
 1